Dawn, is an unincorporated community in Caroline County, in the U.S. state of Virginia. It is located at the intersection of US 301 / SR 2 (Richmond Turnpike) and SR 30 (Dawn Boulevard), roughly east of Doswell, north of Hanover, west of Central Garage, and south of Bowling Green.

Attractions
Dawn has Dawn School. It also has Second Mt. Zion Baptist Church. Lou's Soul Food and Dawn Convenient Store are located in the village too.

Major roads
 provides quick access to nearby Interstate 95, to Kings Dominion and Doswell. 
 provides access to Bowling Green and Richmond.

References

Unincorporated communities in Virginia
Unincorporated communities in Caroline County, Virginia